Rina is a Mexican telenovela produced by Valentín Pimstein for Televisa. It was written by Inés Rodena and starring Ofelia Medina as a eponymous hunchback, Enrique Álvarez Félix as her love interest and María Rubio as the main villain of the history. It is based on the radionovela "Enamorada".

Plot
Rina is a poor hunchback woman selling flowers on the streets of Mexico City. She approaches cars at stop-lights to offer her products and she meets an old rich man. He gets acquainted with Rina and eventually manipulates her into marrying him. The old man dies soon afterwards, and Rina is faced with dealing with his greedy sister-in-law Rafaela and her feelings for the son of that woman, Carlos Augusto.

Cast

Ofelia Medina as Rina Galeana vda. de Zubizarreta/de Zubizarreta
Enrique Álvarez Félix as Carlos Augusto Zubizarreta Miranda y Castro
María Rubio as Doña Rafaela Miranda y Castro vda. de Zubizarreta
Carlos Ancira as Don Leopoldo Zubizarreta
Alicia Rodríguez as María Julia/Victoria
Ana Laura Maldonado Betina
Rafael Llamas as Carmelo
Alicia Encinas as Gisela
Rosa María Moreno as Dionisia
Sasha Montenegro as Marcela
Virginia Gutiérrez as Rosario
Raúl Meraz as Guillermo
Guillermo Zarur as Javier
Otto Sirgo as Omar
Lupita Lara as Margarita
Magda Guzmán as Doña Chana
María Fernanda as Nora
Javier Ruán as Daniel Galeana
Olga Breeskin as Silvia
Demián Bichir as Juanito
Aurora Molina as Eleuteria
Rubén Rojo as Rodolfo
Renata Flores as Renata
Gerardo del Castillo as Manolo
Mauricio Ferrari as Lambertie
Rubén Calderón as Doctor
Miguel Palmer as Lic. Carrillo
Salvador Pineda as El Nene
Daniel Santalucía as Ramiro
Maricruz Nájera as Nurse
Queta Lavat as Martha
Ramiro Orci as El Chato
Tere Grobois as Doña Adelaida
Ángela Villanueva as Angelina
Julián Bravo 
Rafael Banquells as Accuser
Carlos Agostí 
Tony Carbajal as Public Ministry Agent

References

External links

1977 telenovelas
1977 Mexican television series debuts
1978 Mexican television series endings
Mexican telenovelas
Televisa telenovelas
Mexican television series based on Venezuelan television series
Spanish-language telenovelas